The 2016 Under-21 Provincial Championship was the 2016 edition of the Under-21 Provincial Championship, an annual national Under-21 rugby union competition held in South Africa, and was contested from 5 August to 22 October 2016. The competition was won by  who beat  38–34 in the final played on 22 October 2016.

Competition rules and information

There was seven participating teams in the 2016 Under-21 Provincial Championship. These teams played each other once over the course of the season, either at home or away.

Teams received four points for a win and two points for a draw. Bonus points were awarded to teams that scored four or more tries in a game, as well as to teams that lost a match by seven points or less. Teams were ranked by log points, then points difference (points scored less points conceded).

The top four teams qualified for the title play-off semi-finals. The team that finished first had home advantage against the team that finished fourth, while the team that finished second had home advantage against the team that finished third. The final was played as a curtain raiser for the 2016 Currie Cup Premier Division final.

Teams

The following teams took part in the 2016 Under-21 Provincial Championship:

Standings

The final league standings for the 2016 Under-21 Provincial Championship was:

Round-by-round

The table below shows each team's progression throughout the season. For each round, their cumulative points total is shown with the overall log position in brackets:

Matches

The following matches were played in the 2016 Under-21 Provincial Championship:

Round one

Round two

Round three

Round four

Round five

Round six

Round seven

Round eight

Semi-finals

Final

Honours

The honour roll for the 2016 Under-21 Provincial Championship was:

Players

Squads

The following squads were named for the 2016 Under-21 Provincial Championship:

Points scorers

The following table contain points scored in the 2016 Under-21 Provincial Championship:

Discipline

The following table contains all the cards handed out during the competition:

Referees

The following referees officiated matches in the 2016 Under-21 Provincial Championship:

See also

 Currie Cup
 2016 Currie Cup Premier Division
 2016 Currie Cup First Division
 2016 Currie Cup qualification
 2016 Under-20 Provincial Championship
 2016 Under-19 Provincial Championship

References

External links
 

2016 in South African rugby union
2016 rugby union tournaments for clubs
2016